Roy Garden is a former Zimbabwean international lawn and indoor bowler.

Garden was born in Bulawayo in 1961 and was educated in Bulawayo, Harare and Mutare. He joined the police force in 1980 and in 1998 he competed in the Commonwealth Games where he won the gold medal in the singles at the 1998 Commonwealth Games in Kuala Lumpur.

He retired from international competition in January 2014.

References

Living people
1961 births
Sportspeople from Bulawayo
Bowls players at the 1994 Commonwealth Games
Bowls players at the 1998 Commonwealth Games
Bowls players at the 2002 Commonwealth Games
Commonwealth Games medallists in lawn bowls
Zimbabwean male bowls players
Commonwealth Games gold medallists for Zimbabwe
Medallists at the 1998 Commonwealth Games